Jalan Lapangan Terbang Baru Sibu, or New Sibu Airport Road, Federal Route 919, is a federal road in Sibu Division, Sarawak, Malaysia.

At most sections, the Federal Route 919 was built under the JKR R5 road standard, with a speed limit of 90 km/h.

List of junctions and towns

References

Malaysian Federal Roads